Simon Lloyd  was a Welsh Anglican priest in the 17th century.

lloyd was educated at Trinity College, Cambridge. He held livings at Llansilin, Newtown, Bettws, Llanynys, Llanfihangel-y-traethau and Llandudno. He was appointed archdeacon of Merioneth in 1672, a post he held until his death in 1676.

References

Alumni of Trinity College, Cambridge
Archdeacons of Merioneth
17th-century Welsh Anglican priests
1676 deaths